Qarah Bagh (also romanized as Qarah Bāgh and Qareh Bāgh; also known as Ghareh Bagh, Karabakh, and Qara Bāgh) is a village in Anzal-e Shomali Rural District of Anzal District of Urmia County, West Azerbaijan province, Iran. At the 2006 National Census, its population was 1,303 in 389 households. The following census in 2011 counted 1,221 people in 414 households. The latest census in 2016 showed a population of 1,130 people in 376 households; it was the largest village in its rural district.

References 

Urmia County

Populated places in West Azerbaijan Province

Populated places in Urmia County